Phillip L. Pearl is an American child neurologist, author, and jazz pianist. He is the director of Epilepsy and Clinical Neurophysiology at Boston Children's Hospital and William G. Lennox Chair and Professor of Neurology at Harvard Medical School.
Pearl is a recognized leader in metabolic epilepsies and is renowned in his field for his expertise in succinic semialdehyde dehydrogenase deficiency, a rare neurometabolic disorder of GABA degradation. Pearl would frequently be spotted playing jazz piano in the lobby of Children's National Medical Center, where he was former Division Chief of Neurology prior to coming to Boston Children's Hospital.

Books
Pearl published his first book, Inherited Metabolic Epilepsies, in 2012; a second edition was published in 2018 and translated into Chinese. His second book, Neuro-logic: A Primer on Localization, released in 2014, is used as a resource for medical school curricula in the preclinical neuroscience years, and has been translated into Japanese.  He is an editor on the sixth edition of the classic textbook, Swaiman's Pediatric Neurology, as well as editor of "Epilepsy in Children and Adolescents" (Wiley Blackwell Pub 2012) and the recently released "Inherited Metabolic Movement Disorders" with Dr. Ebrahimi-Fakhari (Cambridge Univ Press 2020).  His music CD, Live at Jazzmatazz, was released at Georgetown's Blues Alley and supports the care of indigent children in the nation's capital, and he has recorded lectures on music and medicine that are available on the website of the Child Neurology Society, for which he is President (2019–2021) and Past President of the Professors of Child Neurology.

Personal life
Pearl has four children and lives in the Greater Boston area with his wife, Maria, who is a pediatrician.

References

External links
 
 

1958 births
Johns Hopkins University alumni
Harvard Medical School faculty
Living people
American medical writers
American male non-fiction writers
American neurologists